The Natural Sciences and Engineering Research Council of Canada (NSERC; , CRSNG) is the major federal agency responsible for funding natural sciences and engineering research in Canada. NSERC directly funds university professors and students as well as Canadian companies to perform research and training. With funding from the Government of Canada, NSERC supports the research of over 41,000 students, trainees and professors at universities and colleges in Canada with an annual budget of CA$1.1 billion in 2015. Its current director is Alejandro Adem.

NSERC, combined with the Social Sciences and Humanities Research Council (SSHRC) and the Canadian Institutes of Health Research (CIHR), forms the major source of federal government funding to post-secondary research. These bodies are sometimes collectively referred to as the "Tri-Council" or "Tri-Agency".

History
NSERC came into existence on 1 May 1978 under the Natural Sciences and Engineering Research Council Act, which was passed in an omnibus manner by the government of Pierre Elliot Trudeau. University-based research had previously been supported through the National Research Council of Canada. It reports to Parliament through the Minister of Innovation, Science and Economic Development. It is governed by a Council composed of its president and up to 18 members appointed from the private and public sectors and an executive team of eight persons.

President 
Past presidents include Gordon M. MacNabb (1978-1986), Arthur W. May (1986-1990), Peter Morand (1990-1995), Tom Brzustowski (1995-2005), Suzanne Fortier (2006-2013), and B. Mario Pinto (2014-2018). On 25 June 2019, Alejandro Adem was appointed President of NSERC, effective October 1, 2019.

Grants and awards

Professors
NSERC offers research funding for programs and projects covering every discipline of the sciences and engineering.

Students and fellows
NSERC provides awards, scholarships, and fellowships to graduate and undergraduate students for scientific research.

Partnership programs
NSERC has Research Partnerships Programs to help foster collaborations between university researchers, colleges and other sectors (including government and industry) to develop new knowledge and expertise, transfer it to Canadian-based organizations and meet the objectives of the Government of Canada’s Science & Technology Strategy on innovation.

In February 2021, The Globe and Mail reported that NSERC partnered with Huawei in which the company contributed over CAN $4.8 million in funding for research.

NSERC is also a sponsor of Women in Science and Engineering Newfoundland and Labrador (WISE NL).

See also 
 Canadian government scientific research organizations
 Canadian university scientific research organizations
 Canadian industrial research and development organizations
 Higher education in Canada

References

External links 
 NSERC

Federal departments and agencies of Canada
Funding bodies of Canada
Natural Resources Canada
Scientific organizations based in Canada
Higher education in Canada
1978 establishments in Canada
Government agencies established in 1978